George Walker Wesley Dawson (February 14, 1858 – July 2, 1936) was an Irish-born merchant and political figure in Ontario, Canada. He represented Addington in the House of Commons of Canada from 1891 to 1896 as a Liberal member.

He was born in Sligo, the son of the Reverend Abraham Dawson, and came to Canada West with his family in 1864. He was educated in Kingston and Belleville. Dawson owned a mill. He was a Crown Land agent, reeve for Clarendon Township and also served as postmaster. In 1881, he married Amy Elizabeth Orford. Dawson was defeated when he ran for re-election to the House of Commons in 1896. He later served as inspector of penitentiaries and purchasing agent for the Department of Public Works. He was instrumental in the founding of the Anglican Church in Plevna, Ontario.  Dawson died at his home in The Glebe in Ottawa at the age of 78.

References 
 
The Canadian parliamentary companion, 1891, AJ Gemmill

1858 births
1936 deaths
Members of the House of Commons of Canada from Ontario
Liberal Party of Canada MPs